K162 or K-162 may refer to:

Military
 Soviet submarine K-222, originally numbered K-162

Music
 Symphonies by Wolfgang Amadeus Mozart:
 Symphony No. 22, given the Köchel catalogue number K. 162
 Symphony No. 23, numbered K. 162b

Transportation
 K-162, a highway in Kansas